The P J Bell Stakes is an Australian Turf Club Group 3 Thoroughbred horse race for three-year-old fillies having set weights with penalties conditions, over a distance of 1200 metres, held annually at Randwick Racecourse in Sydney, Australia in the autumn during the ATC Championships series. Total prize money for the race is A$200,000.

History

The race was inaugurated in 1985 and was named after the Champion mare Analie, who won the 1973 Doncaster Handicap and AJC Oaks.

It was renamed in honour of the former Chairman of the Australian Turf Club, P J (Jim) Bell (1921–2006), who was chairman from November 1983 to 1992.

Name

1985–1994 - Analie Handicap
1995–2009 - P J Bell Handicap
2010 - McGrath Estate Stakes
 2011 onwards - P J Bell Stakes

Grade
1985–2013 - Listed Race
2014 onwards  - Group 3

Venue
2011–2013 - Canterbury Park Racecourse
2014 onwards  - Randwick Racecourse

Winners

 2022 - Heresy
 2021 - Matchmaker
 2020 - Rubisaki
 2019 - Multaja
 2018 - Houtzen
 2017 - Diddums
 2016 - Tempt Me Not
2015 - Miss Cover Girl
2014 - Politeness
2013 - Catkins
2012 - Ever The Same
2011 - Red Tracer
2010 - Zingaling
2009 - Ortensia
2008 - Espurante
2007 - Hot 'n' Ready
2006 - Kakakakatie
2005 - Rich Megadale
2004 - Besame Mucho
2003 - Private Steer
2002 - Oomph
2001 - She's Purring
2000 - Mulan Princess
1999 - Wynciti 
1998 - Flickering Fire 
1997 - Dane Ripper
1996 - Presina 
1995 - Verocative 
1994 - Hot To Race 
1993 - Snippet's Girl 
1992 - Regina Madre 
1991 - Peignoir 
1990 - Reverse Pass 
1989 - St. Bridget's Well 
1988 - Bronze Empress 
1987 - Winged Prayer 
1986 - Sweet Dream Lady 
1985 - Deal 

Notes:
  Date of race rescheduled due to postponement of the Easter Saturday meeting because of the heavy track conditions. The meeting was moved to Easter Monday, 6 April 2015.

See also
 List of Australian Group races
 Group races

External links
 P J Bell Stakes (ATC)

References

Horse races in Australia